The Our Lady of the Assumption Cathedral also called Lamego Cathedral is a religious building affiliated with the Catholic Church that was founded in 1129. It is located in the city of Portuguese city of Lamego

The temple follows the Roman or Latin rite and serves as the seat of the diocese of Lamego (Dioecesis Lamacensis or Diocese de Lamego) that was created about 570.

It is a cathedral built in Gothic style, which preserves the bell tower original square, but the rest of the architecture reflects the changes made in the sixteenth and eighteenth centuries, including a Renaissance cloister with a dozen arches and well proportioned.

See also
Roman Catholicism in Portugal
Our Lady of the Assumption

References

Lamego
Churches in Viseu District
Buildings and structures in Lamego
Roman Catholic churches completed in 1129
National monuments in Viseu District
12th-century Roman Catholic church buildings in Portugal